Cochin Port or Kochi Port is a major port on the Arabian Sea – Laccadive Sea – Indian Ocean sea-route in the city of Kochi and is one of the largest ports in India. It is also the first transshipment port in India. The port lies on two islands in the Lake of Kochi: Willingdon Island and Vallarpadam, towards the Fort Kochi river mouth opening onto the Laccadive Sea. The International Container Transshipment Terminal (ICTT), part of the Cochin Port, is the largest container transshipment facility in India.

The port is governed by the Cochin Port Authority (CoPA), a Government of India establishment. It was established in 1928 and has completed over 90 years of active service.

The Kochi Port is one of a line of maritime-related facilities based in the port-city of Kochi. The others are the Cochin Shipyard, the largest shipbuilding as well as maintenance facility in India; the SPM (single point mooring) facility of the Kochi Refineries, an offshore crude carrier mooring facility; and the Kochi Marina.

History 
The Cochin port was formed naturally due to the flooding of the Periyar River in 1341 AD, and, over time, has become a major flashpoint for trade. The port in its initial history attracted European merchants- predominantly Dutch and Portuguese- and was later expanded by the British with the establishment of Willingdon Island. The traditional port was near Mattancherry (which still continues as Mattancherry Wharf).

The idea of establishing a modern port in Cochin was first posited by Lord Willingdon during his governorship of the Madras Province. The opening of the Suez Canal allowed several ships to pass near the west coast and he felt it was necessary to build a modern port in the southern part as well. He selected the newly joined Sir Robert Bristow, a leading British harbour engineer, to head the project, and Bristow became chief engineer of Kochi Kingdom's Port Department in 1920. From that point forward until the port's completion in 1939, he and his team were actively involved in making a greenfield port. With extensive research spanning over a decade toward securing a permanent manmade port that could withstand monsoon erosion, he was convinced that it would be both feasible and largely beneficial to develop Kochi through its port. He believed that Kochi could become the safest harbour in India if the ships could enter the inner channel.

The challenge before engineers was a rock-like sandbar that stood across the opening of Kochi backwaters into the sea. Its density prevented the entry of all large ships (requiring more than eight or nine feet of water). It was thought that the removal of the sandbar was a technical impossibility, and the potential consequence on the environment was beyond estimation. Efforts that had been previously undertaken on this scale had led to ecological atrocities such as destruction of the Vypeen foreshore.

However, Bristow, after a detailed study of wind and sea current conditions, concluded that such issues could easily be avoided. He addressed the immediate problem of Vypeen foreshore's erosion by building granite groynes that were nearly parallel with the shore and overlapped each other. The groynes enabled a system of automatic reclamation which naturally protected the shore from monsoon seas. An ad-hoc committee appointed by the Madras government examined and approved the plans submitted by Bristow.

The construction of the dredger Lord Willingdon was completed in 1925 and arrived in Kochi in May 1926. It was estimated that the dredger was put to use for at least 20 hours a day for the next two years to create a new island to house the Cochin Port and other trade-related establishments. Around 3.2 km2 of land was reclaimed in the dredging. Sir Bristow and his team had successfully completed the port when the steamship SS Padma, was given clearance for the newly constructed inner harbour of Kochi. Speaking to the BBC directly after the port's completion, Bristow proudly proclaimed: "I live on a large island made from the bottom of the sea. It is called Willingdon Island, after the present Viceroy of India. From the upper floor of my house, I look down on the finest harbour in the East." The Willingdon Island was artificially created with the mud sledged out for the harbour construction.

During World War II, the port was taken over by the Royal Navy to accommodate military cruisers and warships. The strategic importance of Cochin during the World Wars was one immediate reason for the construction of the harbour. It aided the British in resisting the Japanese threat, but it also proved crucial domestically in the shaping of Cochin as a modern urban space, reorganising local caste and labour relations. According to a recent study, "[t]the 20-year long project appropriated, modified, or undermined existing social institutions of labour recruitment, work processes, skills and local technologies. The large-scale appropriation and modification of local skills and labour recruitment and work process in this colonial project produced a space of disparity by reinforcing the pre-capitalist caste-based corecive labour relations. The project also involved a massive destruction and appropriation of the social spaces of the urban poor."

In 1932, the Maritime Board of British India declared the Port of Cochin as a major port and was opened to all vessels up to 30 feet draught.
It was returned to civil authorities on 19 May 1945. After the Independence, the port was taken over by the government of India, and in 1964, the administration of the port was vested to a Board of Trustees under the Major Port Trusts Act. The port is currently listed as one of the 12 major ports of India.

In 2022, following the introduction of the Major Port Authorities Act 2021 superseding the Major Port Trusts Act 1963, Cochin Port Trust got renamed to Cochin Port Authority thereby adopting a new logo.

Organizational structure 

Cochin Port Trust is an autonomous body under the government of India and is managed by Board of Trustees constituted by the government. The board is headed by the chairman who acts as the chief executive officer. The government may from time to time nominate the trustees in the Board representing various interests. The chairman is assisted by the deputy chairman who in turn is assisted by department heads and officials of the following port departments:

 General Administration
 Traffic 
 Finance
 Marine 
 Civil Engineering 
 Mechanical Engineering 
 Medical

Navigational channel 

The entrance to the Port of Cochin is through the Cochin Gut between the peninsular headland Vypeen and Fort Kochi. The port limits extend up to the entire backwaters and the connecting creeks and channels. The approach channel to the Cochin Gut is about 1000-metre long with a designed width of 200 meters and maintained dredged depth of 13.8 meters (now dredging for 16 meters for ICTT).

From the gut, the channel divides into Mattancherry and Ernakulam channels, leading west and east of Willingdon Island respectively. Berthing facilities for ships have been provided in the form of wharves, berths, jetties & stream moorings alongside these channels.

Infrastructure facilities 

A draft of 30 ft is maintained in the Ernakulam channel along with berthing facilities, which enables the port to bring in larger vessels. In the Mattancherry channel a draft of 30 ft is maintained. The port provides round-the-clock pilotage to ships subject to certain restrictions on the size and draft. There is an efficient network of railways, roads, waterways and airways, connecting the Cochin Port with the hinterland centers spread over the states of Kerala, Tamil Nadu and Karnataka. Facilities for supply of water and bunkering to vessels are available.

New initiatives 

The CPT launched E-Thuramukham, a comprehensive enterprise resource planning implementation programme, becoming the first Indian port to do so. The project is based on SAP platform and will be customized by Tata Consultancy Services.

The Cochin Port Trust has set up the Maritime Heritage Museum in Willingdon Island where a good collection of unique and rare navigational equipments and photographs connected with the saga of construction of Cochin Port during 1920-40 period are on display. The exhibits reveal the hardships faced by Sir Robert Bristow and his workforce, who developed the port amidst financial constraints and without technology support.

See also
Ports in Kerala
Cochin Port Maritime Heritage Museum

References

External links

 Official website of the Cochin Port Authority
 Kochi LNG Terminal

Economy of Kochi
Ports and harbours of Kerala
Companies based in Kochi
Transport in Kochi
1928 establishments in India
Buildings and structures in Kochi
Infrastructure completed in 1928
20th-century architecture in India